This is a partial list of Jupiter's  trojans (60° ahead of Jupiter) with numbers 300001–400000 .

300001–400000 

This list contains 1109 objects sorted in numerical order.

top

References 
 

 Greek_3
Jupiter Trojans (Trojan Camp)
Lists of Jupiter trojans